San Juan Chamelco is a town, with a population of 13,264 (2018 census), and a municipality in the Guatemalan department of Alta Verapaz. The municipality is situated at 1350 metres above sea level and covers an area of 228 km². The annual festival is on June 24.

Climate

San Juan Chamelco has temperate climate (Köppen: Cfb).

Geographic location

San Juan Chamelco is surrounded by Alta Verapaz Department municipalities.

See also

 Fernando Romeo Lucas Garcia

References

External links
Muni in Spanish

Municipalities of the Alta Verapaz Department